Ranomafana is a genus of beetles belonging to the family Pyrochroidae.

Species:
 Ranomafana steineri Pollock, 1995

References

Pyrochroidae
Polyphaga genera